Bukit Tambun is a town, a suburb of Simpang Ampat in Penang, Malaysia.

Transport 
Bukit Tambun has North-South Expressway (PLUS) exits. It also can be accessed by Sultan Abdul Halim Bridge.

References 

Towns in Penang